Saul Solomon (15 January 1836 – 2 May 1929) was an artist born in Knightsbridge the son of Lawrence Solomon, of Grosvenor Square He left for Australia on the Gambia,  a vessel of 1000 tons (not Gambier) in June 1852. He prospected for gold in Bendigo, Victoria, ran a photographic business in Bourke Street, Melbourne, then Ballarat and finally Adelaide where he worked for many years with Townsend Duryea, finally founding the Adelaide School of Photography, owned by Duryea. He was one of the founders of the Adelaide branch of the Independent Order of Oddfellows. After the fire in Duryea's studio, the School building took over much of the functions of the King William Street premises. He was co-founder with Robert Carr Castle (1835 – 14 June 1896) in 1879 of the Academy of Music (despite its grandiloquent title, actually a place of light entertainment) on Rundle Street, which burnt down three times. He was a member, and for a time chairman, of the consortium that in 1885 built the Adelaide Arcade.

He was elected to the House of Assembly for East Torrens in 1887, beating The Hon. Thomas Playford. In 1890 he moved to Mount Gambier, where he ran one of the leading hotels.

The family moved to Northam, Western Australia, where he ran an extensive farm "Morby" and a bacon factory, and was a foundation member of the Northam Agricultural Society. He served as mayor for over 20 years, and was active in the Mechanics' Institute and School Board.
He died in 1929; Patti died four years later; they had celebrated their diamond wedding in 1926.

Family
Solomon married Martha "Patti" Kemp (20 May 1846 – 25 October 1933) in Carlton, Victoria on 13 October 1866
Joseph Francis "Joe" Solomon (1870– )
Emma Amelia Solomon (1873– )
Laurence Alexander "Alex" Solomon (1875 – March 1924)
Mabel Patti Solomon (1877 – 18 November 1924) married William P. Dempster, eldest son of Hon. C. E. Dempster
Bertram Marcus "Bert" Solomon (1879 – )
Herbert Abraham Solomon (1881 – 16 April 1901) died in South Africa during the Boer War

References

Australian photographers
Photographers from Adelaide
Members of the South Australian House of Assembly
Mayors of places in Western Australia
1836 births
1929 deaths